Amos Mkhari (born in Ga-Rankuwa – died 7 October 2014 in Tshwane) was a South African footballer commonly known as "Heel Extension" or "Shuffle".

Biography 
Mkhari's debuted professionally in 1974 with the Witbank Spurs F.C., who he played with for four years. In 1978, he began playing for the Orlando Pirates F.C., who he played with for eight years. In 1980, he was part of the team that won the Nedbank Cup.

References 

2014 deaths
South African soccer players
Orlando Pirates F.C. players
Year of birth missing

Association footballers not categorized by position